The Silver Cord is the Classic Crime's second full-length studio album. It was released on July 22, 2008, on Tooth & Nail Records.

Background
The Classic Crime describes their second album The Silver Cord as their "heaviest, darkest album yet". "Abracadavers", the first single from the album, was released on their MySpace page and on the iTunes Store on June 3, 2008. The single, along with "5805" and "Gravedigging", had previously been performed live. "Gravedigging" can be found on the 2008 Warped Tour CD, and streamed at the band's MySpace page. The full album "The Silver Cord" was eventually posted in the band's MySpace Player.

Significance of 5805
According to a blog entry posted on the Classic Crime's MySpace page, "5805" is a notably meaningful number for the band.  In addition to being the title of the fifth track on the record, it is the address where the Classic Crime first formed and practiced.  Multiple members of the band have tattoos of this number, and extraordinarily, The Silver Cord sold exactly 5,805 copies in its first week.  This amazed the band enough for them to dedicate a full explanation of the symbolism of this number in a blog entry. "The number is of crazy significance," Matt MacDonald said in the blog. "And I can't tell you how BLOWN AWAY we all were to get our sound scan report today!"

Track listing
All songs written by Matt MacDonald, except where noted.
 "The End" – 1:47
 "Just a Man" – 2:56
 "Gravedigging" (Robbie Negrin, Paul Erickson, MacDonald) – 3:45
 "The Way That You Are" – 3:33
 "5805" (Justin DuQue, MacDonald) – 3:39
 "Salt in the Snow" (DuQue, MacDonald) – 5:34
 "Abracadavers" (DuQue, Erickson, MacDonald, Negrin) – 3:46
 "R & R" – 3:48
 "God & Drugs" – 4:15
 "Medisin" (DuQue, Erickson, MacDonald) – 3:55
 "The Ascent" (Alan Clark, DuQue, Erickson, MacDonald)– 1:54
 "Sing" – 3:00
 "Everything" (MacDonald, Negrin) – 3:34
 "Closer Than We Think" – 4:07
 "The Beginning (A Simple Seed)" – 5:02

Credits

 Michael "Elvis" Baskette - producer, mixing
 Dave Holdredge - engineer
 Jef Moll - digital editing

Personnel
Matt MacDonald - Vocals
Justin DuQue - Guitar
Robbie Negrin - Guitar
Alan Clark - Bass
Paul Erickson - Drums

Charts

References

2008 albums
The Classic Crime albums
Tooth & Nail Records albums
Albums produced by Michael Baskette